Ontelaunee may refer to the following in Berks County, Pennsylvania:

 Ontelaunee Township, Berks County, Pennsylvania
 Ontelaunee Creek
 Lake Ontelaunee